Jaak Panksepp (June 5, 1943–April 18, 2017) was an Estonian-American neuroscientist and psychobiologist who coined the term "affective neuroscience", the name for the field that studies the neural mechanisms of emotion. He was the Baily Endowed Chair of Animal Well-Being Science for the Department of Veterinary and Comparative Anatomy, Pharmacology, and Physiology at Washington State University's College of Veterinary Medicine, and Emeritus Professor of the Department of Psychology at Bowling Green State University. He was known in the popular press for his research on laughter in non-human animals.

Early life and education
Panksepp was born in Tartu, Estonia on June 5, 1943. His family escaped the ravages of post-WWII Soviet occupation by moving to the United States when he was very young. He studied initially at University of Pittsburgh in 1964, and then completed a Ph.D. at the University of Massachusetts.

Research
Panksepp resisted establishment forces in animal research, the most notably B. F. Skinner’s school of behaviorism which held that human emotions are irrelevant and animal emotions suspect.  He was ridiculed for wanting to study the neuroscience of affect, and he struggled to find research funding.  Panksepp conducted many experiments; in one with rats, he found that the rats showed signs of fear when cat hair was placed close to them, even though they had never been anywhere near a cat. Panksepp theorized from this experiment that it is possible laboratory research could routinely be skewed due to researchers with pet cats. He attempted to replicate the experiment using dog hair, but the rats displayed no signs of fear.

In the 1999 documentary Why Dogs Smile and Chimpanzees Cry, he is shown to comment on the research of joy in rats: the tickling of domesticated rats made them produce a high-pitch sound which was hypothetically identified as laughter.

Panksepp is also well known for publishing a paper in 1979 suggesting that opioid peptides could play a role in the etiology of autism, which proposed that autism may be "an emotional disturbance arising from an upset in the opiate systems in the brain".

In his book Affective Neuroscience, Panksepp described how efficient learning may be conceptually achieved through the generation of subjectively experienced neuroemotional states that provide simple internalized codes of biological value that correspond to major life priorities .

Primary affective systems
Panksepp carved out seven biologically inherited primary affective systems called SEEKING (expectancy), FEAR (anxiety), RAGE (anger), LUST (sexual excitement), CARE (nurturance), PANIC/GRIEF (sadness), and PLAY (social joy). He proposed what is known as "core-SELF" to be generating these affects.

Death
Panksepp died on April 18, 2017 from cancer at his home in Bowling Green, Ohio at the age of 73.

Books
 Panksepp, J., and Davis, K. (2018). The Emotional Foundations of Personality: A Neurobiological and Evolutionary Approach. New York: W. W. Norton & Company. W W Norton page
 Narvaez, D., Panksepp, J., Schore, A., & Gleason, T. (Eds.) (2013). "Evolution, Early Experience and Human Development: From Research to Practice and Policy". New York: Oxford University Press. 
 Panksepp, J., and Biven, L. (2012). The Archaeology of Mind: Neuroevolutionary Origins of Human Emotion. New York: W. W. Norton & Company. W W Norton page
 Panksepp J (Ed.) (2004) A Textbook of Biological Psychiatry, New York, Wiley
 Panksepp, J. (1998). Affective Neuroscience: The Foundations of Human and Animal Emotions. New York: Oxford University Press.
 Panksepp, J (Ed.) (1996). Advances in Biological Psychiatry, Vol. 2, Greenwich, CT: JAI Press.
 Panksepp, J (Ed.) (1995). Advances in Biological Psychiatry, Vol. 1, Greenwich, CT: JAI Press.
 Clynes, M. and Panksepp, J. (Eds.) (1988). Emotions and Psychopathology, New York, Plenum Press.
 Morgane, J. P., and Panksepp, J. (Eds.). (1981). Handbook of the Hypothalamus: Vol. 4 : Part B. Behavioral Studies of the Hypothalamus. New York: Marcel Dekker, Inc.
 Morgane, J. P., and Panksepp, J. (Eds.). (1980). Handbook of the Hypothalamus: Vol. 3 : Part A. Behavioral Studies of the Hypothalamus. New York: Marcel Dekker, Inc.
 Morgane, J. P., and Panksepp, J. (Eds.). (1980). Handbook of the Hypothalamus: Vol. 2 : Physiology of the Hypothalamus. New York: Marcel Dekker, Inc.
 Morgane, J. P., and Panksepp, J. (Eds.). (1979). Handbook of the Hypothalamus: Vol. 1 : Anatomy of the Hypothalamus. New York: Marcel Dekker, Inc.

See also
 Affective neuroscience
 Empathy
 Laughter
 Neuroscience
 Social neuroscience

References

Citations

Sources

External links
 Jaak Panksepp's Bowling Green State University website
 Jaak Panksepp's Washington State University website
 Biography at the Muskingum College website
 Interview with the Autism Research Institute
 Empathy and the action-perception resonances of basic socio-emotional systems of the brain Panksepp, Jaak; Gordon, Nakia; Burgdorf, Jeff Behavioral and Brain Sciences, Vol 25(1), Feb 2002, 43–44. 

1943 births
2017 deaths
Estonian neuroscientists
American neuroscientists
Bowling Green State University faculty
Estonian expatriates in the United States
Scientists from Tartu
Washington State University faculty
Recipients of the Order of the White Star, 4th Class
Estonian World War II refugees
Estonian emigrants to the United States